A list of animated feature films that were released in  2013.

Highest-grossing animated films of 2013
The top ten animated films by worldwide gross in 2013 as of 16 of January 2015 are as follows:

Frozen grossed over $1.2 billion, making it the 15th highest-grossing film of all time, and the eighteenth film to surpass the billion dollar mark, respectively. It also became the second animated film after Toy Story 3 to gross $1 billion, and is the second highest-grossing animated film of all time worldwide.

See also 
 List of animated television series of 2013

References

2013
2013-related lists

zh:日本動畫列表 (2013年)